The surname Katongole may refer to:

 Edward Katongole-Mbidde, Ugandan physician and medical expert
 Emmanuel Katongole (businessman), Ugandan CEO of Quality Chemical Industries Limited
 Emmanuel Katongole (theologian), Ugandan Catholic priest and theologian
 Jolly Katongole (1985–2015), Ugandan boxes